Cydeways: The Best of the Pharcyde is a greatest hits album by Los Angeles hip hop group The Pharcyde. It was released November 14, 2001. The album features songs by the four emcees; Fatlip, Slimkid3, Imani and Bootie Brown from their first two albums Bizarre Ride II the Pharcyde and Labcabincalifornia while they were signed to label Delicious Vinyl.

The original recordings on Cydeways were handled by J-Swift, L.A. Jay & Slimkid3, J Dilla (known then as Jay Dee) and Fatlip. Included on the album is a remix of the song "She Said" by Jay Dee and the previously unreleased song "Panty Raid".

Track listing

References

The Pharcyde albums
Albums produced by J Dilla
2001 greatest hits albums